Ray Lindwall was a key member of Donald Bradman's famous Australian cricket team, which toured England in 1948. The Australians went undefeated in their 34 matches; this unprecedented feat by a Test side touring England earned them the sobriquet The Invincibles.

Lindwall played as a right-arm opening fast bowler and right-handed batsman in the lower middle-order. Along with Keith Miller, Lindwall formed Australia's first-choice pace duo, regarded as one of the best of all time, and Bradman typically used them in short and sharp bursts against the home batsmen. The pair were used to target England's leading batsmen, Len Hutton and Denis Compton during the major matches, and subdued Hutton for much of the summer. England had agreed to make a new ball available after every 55 overs, more often than the usual regulations at the time, thereby allowing the pair more frequent use of a shiny ball that swung at high pace. Bradman gave the duo lighter workloads in the tour matches in order to preserve their energy for the new ball battles against England's key batsmen in the Tests. Lindwall was a capable lower-order batsman who made two Test centuries during his career, and he featured in several rearguard actions that boosted Australia's scores during the tour.

Lindwall was the equal leading wicket-taker in the Tests (27 along with Bill Johnston) and had the best bowling average (19.62) and strike rate. In the first-class matches, he led the averages although he was second in the wicket-taking list with 86 at 15.68 behind Johnston (102), who was assigned more of the workload in order to keep Miller and Lindwall fresh for the Tests. With the bat, Lindwall scored 191 runs at a batting average of 31.83 in the Tests.

Lindwall's most influential contributions in the Ashes matches were his 5/70 in the first innings of the Second Test at Lord's, a hard-hitting 77 that limited Australia's first innings deficit in the Fourth Test at Headingley, and most notably, his 6/20 on the first day of the Fifth Test at The Oval. The performance was a display of extreme pace and swing that earned high praise from pundits and was largely responsible for England being bowled out for 52. Outside the Tests, Lindwall took 11/59 in a match against Sussex, with eight of his victims being bowled as the ball curved through their defences at high pace. In recognition of his achievements, Lindwall was chosen as one of the five Wisden Cricketers of the Year. Wisden said that "by whatever standard he is judged ... [Lindwall] must be placed permanently in the gallery of great fast bowlers".

Background  
A bowler of express pace, Lindwall was a regular member of the Test team and had opened Australia's attack since the resumption of cricket following World War II. During the Australian summer of 1947–48, Lindwall played in all five Tests against the touring India national cricket team. He played a major part in Australia's 4–0 series win as the leading wicket-taker with 18 scalps at an average of 16.88, ahead of Ian Johnson and Bill Johnston who took 16 apiece at averages of 16.31 and 11.37 respectively. As a result, Lindwall was selected as part of Don Bradman's Invincibles that toured England without defeat in 1948, with the intention of leading the pace attack. There were two concerns for Lindwall in the lead-up to the tour. Lindwall had been playing with an injured leg tendon and his foot drag during the delivery stride led to discussion in the media and among umpires as to its legality. Bradman arranged for Lindwall to see his Melbourne masseur Ern Saunders, who restored the paceman's leg to prime condition in a fortnight. On the public relations front, Bradman stated his firm belief in the fairness of Lindwall's delivery. During the lengthy sea voyage to England, Bradman emphasized the importance of caution with respect to his bowling action. Bradman advised Lindwall to ensure that his dragging rear right foot was further behind the line than usual to avoid being no-balled, and to refrain from bowling at full speed until the umpires were satisfied with his delivery stride. The Australian captain guaranteed Lindwall selection for the Tests and told him that his first priority in the lead-in tour matches was passing the umpires' scrutiny. Bradman recalled how paceman Ernie McCormick had been no-balled 35 times in the traditional tour opener against Worcester during the 1938 campaign, destroying his confidence for the rest of the season.

Early tour 

In the lead-up to the match against Worcestershire, photographers and cameramen constantly followed Lindwall, trying to capture visual evidence of an illegal drag when he was bowling in the practice nets. Bradman tried to stop the journalists from taking photographs of the crease as Lindwall came in to bowl, and deflected media questions about his bowler's drag. The spectators and media were keenly observing the position of his foot in the tour opener, but Lindwall was not no-balled in the first match at Worcester, and complaints about his drag faded away for the rest of the tour. The hosts elected to bat first, and Lindwall took 2/41 in the first innings, bowling and trapping his victims leg before wicket before delivering three wicketless overs for 19 runs in the second innings. Lindwall took a wicket with his second ball in England, trapping Don Kenyon for a duck to leave the hosts at 1/0. He was promoted to No. 4 as Bradman rotated his batting order and he scored a quickfire 32 from 34 balls with six boundaries before Australia completed an innings victory. According to former Australian Test batsman and journalist Jack Fingleton, Lindwall "took things very quietly ... The fast bowler is very wise who builds up his speed match by match". With the media and public attention now focused on actual bowling, Lindwall's classical bowling action evoked almost as much interest as his captain's batting.

Bradman rested Lindwall for the second tour match against Leicestershire, which ended in an innings victory for the Australians. Lindwall returned for the next fixture against Yorkshire at Bradford, but bowled only nine overs for a total of 1/16. He made a duck in the first innings on a damp pitch favourable to slower bowling, as Australia scraped home by four wickets. Lindwall was due in next when Australia collapsed to 6/31 in pursuit of 60 for victory in the second innings. The tourists were effectively seven wickets down with the injured Sam Loxton unable to bat, but Neil Harvey and Don Tallon saw Australia to the target without further loss. It was the closest Australia came to defeat for the whole tour. The Australians travelled to London to play Surrey at The Oval. They batted first and Lindwall managed only four, clean bowled by Alec Bedser, as Australia amassed 632. He then took the first two wickets to reduce Surrey to 2/15 in the first innings. Bradman used Lindwall sparingly, taking a match total of 3/45 from 25 overs as Surrey were defeated by an innings. Fingleton felt that Lindwall was at his fastest for the season during the Surrey match. One of Lindwall's bouncers flew over three feet above the batsman's head.

Lindwall had another light workout in the match against Cambridge University, taking match figures of 1/33 from nine overs. His solitary wicket was that of Doug Insole, and he was not required to bat as Australia completed another innings victory. After the fixture against Cambridge, Lindwall was rested for two consecutive matches. In the first, Australia crushed Essex by an innings and 451 runs, its largest winning margin for the summer. The second match resulted in another innings victory, this time over Oxford University.

Lindwall was brought back for the match against the Marylebone Cricket Club (MCC) at Lord's. The MCC fielded seven players who would represent England in the Tests, and were basically a full strength Test team, while Australia selected their first-choice team. It was a chance for the Australian pace attack to gain a psychological advantage ahead of the Tests, with Len Hutton, Denis Compton and Bill Edrich—three of England's first four batsmen—all playing. Australia batted first and Lindwall scored 29, including three sixes from the bowling of England Test off spinner Jim Laker. After Australia amassed 552, Lindwall took combined figures of 2/68, removing Compton and England and MCC captain Norman Yardley as the tourists enforced the follow on by an innings and 158 runs. The MCC fixture was followed by Australia's first non-victory of the tour against Lancashire. After the first day was washed out, Lindwall made a duck and then took 3/44, removing Test players Ken Cranston and Jack Ikin during the hosts' only innings. He was not required to bat in the second innings as the match petered into a draw on the final day.

In the next match against Nottinghamshire at Trent Bridge, Lindwall took 6/14 to gain a psychological blow ahead of the First Test to be held at the same venue. After taking the first four wickets and cutting through the top-order, the paceman returned to finish off the tail and ensure the hosts were dismissed for 179. Lindwall bowled three of his victims with fast and swinging yorkers. He delivered 91 balls, conceding less than a run per over. Only ten of his balls were scored from and not a single run was taken from his last 30 balls. Fingleton said that Lindwall "absolutely paralysed" the batsmen, with some of his bowling "in the real Larwood manner". Harold Larwood was a Nottinghamshire express pace bowler of the 1920s and 1930s who led the controversial Bodyline attack in Australia in 1932–33, and Lindwall modelled his bowling action on Larwood after seeing him in action at the Sydney Cricket Ground during the tour. Lindwall could only manage eight runs with the bat and was unable to repeat his incisive bowling in the second innings, sending down 14 wicketless overs as the match ended in a draw.

Lindwall was rested for Australia's eight-wicket win over Hampshire, before returning in the following match against Sussex. Bowling with a tailwind, he took two early wickets before returning to remove the last four batsmen to fall. Five of Lindwall's opponents were bowled as he ended with 6/34 from 19.4 overs; the hosts were dismissed for 86. During the tourists' reply, Bradman promoted Lindwall to No. 4 and he came to the wicket at 2/342, scored 57 and put on 93 runs with Neil Harvey, who scored an unbeaten 100 as Australia declared at 5/549. Lindwall then broke through with two early wickets to leave Sussex at 2/2, and went on to finish with 5/25 in 15 overs as the home side were bowled out for 138, handing Bradman's men a victory by an innings and 325 runs in two days. He ended with match figures of 11/59, with eight of his victims being bowled, five of these by swinging yorkers, unable to counter Lindwall's swerving deliveries. Fingleton said that "Lindwall bundled the stumps over in all directions" as Sussex "crumpled completely ... in as depressing a batting performance as the tour knew".

First Test 

Lindwall lined up for the First Test at Trent Bridge, a venue where he had taken six wickets in the tour game against Nottinghamshire. Australia bowled first, and Lindwall delivered the first ball of the match at a moderate pace; Hutton pushed it square of the wicket on the off side for a single to start proceedings. Lindwall gradually increased his speed and rhythm, and took the wicket of Cyril Washbrook, caught on the run by Bill Brown on the fine leg boundary after the batsman had attempted a hook shot. However, he was forced to leave the field with a groin strain midway through the first day, ending with figures of 1/30. After England were out for 165, Lindwall came out to bat at 7/365 without a runner on the third day, and appeared to be able to run twos and threes without significant difficulty. He added 107 runs for the eighth wicket with vice-captain Lindsay Hassett. Hassett reached his century and proceeded to 137 in almost six hours of batting before Bedser struck his off stump. Four runs later, Lindwall was caught by wicket-keeper Godfrey Evans down the leg side to leave the total at 6/469, but some free hitting by Australia's last pair allowed them to advance to 509, giving them a 344-run lead.

Although Lindwall was able to jog between the wickets, he did not take the field in the second innings and the 12th man Neil Harvey replaced him. This gave Australia a marked fielding advantage—Fingleton described Harvey as "by far the most brilliant fieldsman of both sides". Yardley was sceptical as to whether Lindwall was sufficiently injured to be forced from the field, but he did not formally object to Harvey's presence on the field. Journalist, former Australian Test cricketer and Lindwall mentor Bill O'Reilly, said that as Lindwall demonstrated his mobility during his innings, he was in no way "incapacitated" and that the English captain "must be condemned for carrying his concepts of sportsmanship too far" when no substitute was justified. O'Reilly decried the benefit Australia derived through the substitution, agreeing with Fingleton that Harvey was the tourists' best fielder by far. English commentator John Arlott went further, calling Harvey the best fielder in the world.

However, the gains provided by Harvey were outweighed by Lindwall's absence, which severely hampered Australia's bowling and made their eventual victory much more difficult. England made 441 and Australia reached their target of 98 on the final afternoon to complete an eight-wicket victory. Due to his injury, Lindwall was omitted from the team for the two matches leading up to the Second Test. Australia proceeded to defeat Northamptonshire by an innings before drawing with Yorkshire.

Second Test 

Two weeks after injuring himself at Trent Bridge, Lindwall undertook a thorough fitness examination on the morning of the Second Test at Lord's. Bradman was not convinced of the bowler's fitness, but Lindwall—keen to play at the historic ground known as the "home of cricket"—was able to convince his captain to risk his inclusion. Australia won the toss and elected to bat, allowing Lindwall further time to recover. He came in late on the first afternoon with the score at 7/246 and made three runs before stumps were called at 7/258. The next morning, Lindwall batted confidently from the outset. He hit two cover drives for four from Bedser after the new ball had been taken, prompting O'Reilly to say that Lindwall was playing in the same manner as when he made his maiden Test century in the last Ashes series in 1946–47. However, he then played around a straight ball from Bedser, and was bowled for 15 to leave the score at 275/8. Australia were out for 350 shortly before lunch on the second morning. In the hosts' reply, Lindwall took the new ball and felt pain in his groin after delivering the first ball of the innings to Len Hutton. Despite this, the paceman persevered through the pain.

In his fourth over, Lindwall had Washbrook caught behind for eight after needlessly playing at a ball wide outside off stump. Before lunch, Lindwall bowled six overs and took 1/7, while Bill Johnston accompanied him from the other end because Keith Miller had a back injury and was only able to bat. Neither Hutton nor Washbrook appeared comfortable against the bowling, and the new batsman Bill Edrich tried to hit Lindwall through the off side, leading to a loud appeal for caught behind, which was turned down. After the lunch break, Hutton fell, and Compton came in, having been dismissed hit wicket after falling over in the First Test while trying to avoid a bouncer. Lindwall delivered a few short balls straight away, but the new batsman was not caught off-guard. Lindwall then clean bowled Bill Edrich—who was playing across the line of the ball—for five. Tom Dollery was the new batsman and stopped the first ball with his pads before Lindwall's next delivery broke through his defences and hit the stumps to send him back to the pavilion for a duck. Dollery's bat was about to start its downward swing by the time Lindwall's outswinger had passed him and hit the stumps. O'Reilly said that Dollery's inability to deal with Lindwall was typical of English cricket's lack of answers to express pace bowling. This was part of a six-over post-lunch spell of 2/11 by Lindwall; the batsmen appeared unable to deal with his swing and extreme pace. England were 4/46 and Australia firmly in control, but the home side were given some respite when both Lindwall and Johnston were taken out of the attack. Australia had the option of taking the new ball just before the tea break, but Bradman decided to wait so his two pacemen could have an extra 20 minutes to replenish their energy levels.

Once the second new ball was taken after tea, Lindwall returned but appeared to be tired and lacking in spirit in his first over. Johnston removed Compton, and one run later, Lindwall clipped Yardley's off stump with the first ball of the next over to leave England at 134/6; the home skipper had made 44 before an outswinger had evaded his bat as he attempted to play a back foot defensive shot. At the start of the third morning, he bowled Alec Bedser off an inside edge from a bouncer to finish with 5/70 as Australia took a 135-run first innings lead on the third morning. O'Reilly said Lindwall "bowled as well as any fast bowler can bowl. He always seemed to have the situation sized up correctly and he knew just when to put his all into the task ... and enjoyed a triumph which seldom comes to any bowler." Arlott praised Lindwall for his subtle variations in pace, line and length, and how he kept the batsman guessing as to what was coming to them.

Bradman's batsmen set about building on their lead and Lindwall was initially not expected to bat; the Australian captain was expected to declare just before lunch on the fourth day so he could attack the English openers for a short period before the adjournment, but a shower deterred him from doing so, as his bowlers would have struggled to grip the ball. Lindwall had also been injured on a slippery surface in earlier times. Lindwall came to the crease to join Miller with Australia at 5/416 on the fourth afternoon. They attacked at every opportunity before the declaration. Miller fell and Lindwall ran out of his crease in attempt to hit Laker across the line to the boundary. He missed and was stumped for 25. This prompted Bradman to declare at 7/460 immediately upon his dismissal, leaving England to chase a world record 596 for victory.

Further showers breathed extra life into the pitch at the start of the run chase, and Lindwall and Johnston extracted steep bounce with the new ball, troubling the English batsmen. Lindwall dropped Hutton from Johnston's bowling before he had scored and the English batsmen played and missed multiple times. Hutton had trouble seeing and playing Lindwall's deliveries in the deteriorating light with no sightscreen available, and Fingleton described it as "probably Hutton's worst effort in a Test". O'Reilly said Hutton "seemed to have lost all power of concentration and looked like a man being led to the gallows", calling him "little more than a masquerader compared to the Hutton [of 1938]". Hutton took 32 minutes of batting to score his first run of the innings.

Hutton and Washbrook took the score to 42—England's highest opening partnership of the series thus far—before the latter edged Lindwall to Johnson in the slips and was out for 13. Edrich and Washbrook were then subjected to repeated short balls, and the latter was hit several times on the fingers while fending down Lindwall's bouncers, having decided to avoid the hook shot. However, they survived Lindwall's spell of bowling. Late in the day, Lindwall was brought back to put pressure on Dollery, having bowled him for a duck in the first innings, but the batsman had already been in the middle for a short period, and played the pace bowling with more assurance.

Lindwall returned on the final morning with the score at 6/141. Dollery, who had been batting with assurance, shaped to duck under a Lindwall bouncer, but it skidded through low and bowled him. Later in the same over, Lindwall bowled Laker for a duck to leave England at 8/141. The match ended when Doug Wright hit Ernie Toshack to Lindwall and was caught for four. Lindwall ended with 3/61 as Australia took a 409-run victory. Arlott said that while Toshack (5/40) had the best figures, Lindwall was the pivotal figure. He said that when Lindwall "so patently disturbed Hutton he struck a blow at the morale of the English batting that was never overcome." In later years, Bradman told Lindwall he pretended not to notice the bowler's pain. Lindwall was worried Bradman had noticed his injury and would be disappointed, but the Australian captain later claimed to have feigned ignorance to allow Lindwall to relax and focus on his bowling.

After carrying an injury into the Second Test, Bradman rested Lindwall for the match against Surrey, which started the day after the proceedings at Lord's ended; Australia took a ten-wicket victory. Lindwall returned for the match against Gloucestershire. Australia batted first and made 7/774, its highest score of the tour and the second highest by any Australian team in England. Lindwall was not able to partake in the prolific run-getting, as the tourists declared before he had scored. He bowled a total of 21 overs, taking 0/41 as Australia enforced the follow on and won by an innings and 363 runs.

Third Test 

When the teams reconvened at Old Trafford for the Third Test, Hutton had been dropped, sparking much acrimony and controversy in the English cricket community. The reason was said to be Hutton's difficulties against Lindwall's short-pitched bowling. Observers noticed Hutton backing away, and the English selectors believed such a sight would have a negative effect on the rest of the side as it was a poor example from a key player. The Australians were pleased and believed the England selectors had erred, because they regarded Hutton as the hosts' best batsman. England batted first and Lindwall removed Hutton's replacement as opener, George Emmett, who fended a short ball to Sid Barnes at short leg to leave England at 2/28. Emmett had been surprised by Lindwall's bouncer and took his eyes from the ball, fending with one hand on the bat, while ducking his head below his arms. The ball bounced slowly off the pitch and after hitting Emmett's bat, rebounded gently up in the air for Barnes to collect. In Australia's match against Gloucestershire immediately preceding the Test, Lindwall bowled a bouncer to Emmett, who hesitantly parried it away for a single. Lindwall did not bounce Emmett again during the match, and O’Reilly surmised that the paceman was quietly waiting until the Tests to expose his opponent's weakness against the short ball. O’Reilly concluded that Lindwall and Johnston "had again disposed of the English opening batsmen with the minimum amount of effort".

Lindwall then struck Edrich on the hand with a short ball, provoking angry heckling from spectators who compared him to Larwood. During this period, both Edrich and Compton found it difficult to position themselves quickly enough to play Lindwall. The Australian paceman then hit Compton on the arm, and soon after, felled him with a bouncer that the batsman top-edged into his face. This forced Compton to leave the field with a bloodied eyebrow with the score at 2/33. Upon hearing the umpire's call of no-ball while the ball was travelling towards him, and knowing he was immune from dismissal, Compton decided to change his stroke. Having initially positioned himself to deflect the ball into the leg side, he then attempted to hook the ball, but could not readjust quickly enough. The velocity of the ball was such that after rebounding from his head, it flew more than half-way to the boundary before landing. This was followed by a period of slow play as England tried to regroup.

Lindwall returned to take the second new ball and trapped Jack Crapp, who did not offer a shot, for 37 to leave the score at 3/87. The batsman misjudged the line of a straight ball and thought it had pitched and struck his leg outside off stump. Lindwall later had Edrich gloving a rearing ball to the wicket-keeper to leave England at 5/119. Compton returned upon the fall of the fifth wicket to revive the innings and Lindwall ended with 4/99 after having Godfrey Evans caught behind from an expansive cut shot. England ended on 363 all out on the second day; Compton made an unbeaten 145. Lindwall had beaten Compton in each of his last three overs before lunch on the second day, but the Englishman survived to add more than 20 further runs. On the third day, Lindwall came to the crease at 6/172 after Barnes—who had collapsed due to the aftereffects of being hit in the ribs from point blank range when fielding—had been forced to retire hurt. Australia faced the prospect of being forced to follow on, and Lindwall received five consecutive bouncers from Edrich, one of which hit him in the hand, evoking cheers from the home crowd. Lindwall made 23 as Australia struggled to 221 and avoided the follow on by eight runs; he was the last man to be dismissed.

At the start of England's second innings, Washbrook took a single from Lindwall, who promptly removed Emmett for a duck. Lindwall pitched an outswinger on the line of off stump and Emmett edged it to wicket-keeper Tallon, who dived and took it in his right hand. This brought Lindwall's tormentor Edrich to the crease. Bradman advised Lindwall not to bounce Edrich, fearing this would be interpreted as retaliation and generate negative media attention. However, Miller retaliated with four consecutive bouncers, angering the crowd. He struck Edrich on the body before Bradman and ordered him to stop; the Australian captain apologised to Edrich for the hostile bowling. Lindwall bounced Washbrook and was no-balled by umpire Dai Davies for dragging his foot beyond the line. After a disagreement, Davies threw Lindwall his jumper, but the tension faded away and the paceman was not no-balled again after discussing the matter with Bradman. Lindwall bounced Washbrook again and this time the England opener went for the hook shot. The ball flew off the top edge in the air, straight towards Hassett at fine leg, who dropped the catch after juggling three times. Having received a reprieve on 21, Washbrook settled down and reached 50 in only 70 minutes with England at 1/80.

Lindwall returned for a new spell late on the third day and almost hit Washbrook in the head. Hassett again dropped Washbrook, who was on 78 when he again hooked Lindwall to long leg. The Australian vice-captain responded by borrowing a helmet from a nearby policeman to signify his need for protection from the ball, much to the amusement of the crowd. Lindwall ended with 1/37 as England declared at their stumps score of 3/174 after the entire fourth day and the final morning was washed out. The match petered into a draw with Lindwall not required as Australia safely batted out the final day. Lindwall played in Australia's only match—against Middlesex—before the Fourth Test, but was not at his best. He and Miller had been partying heavily in the days before the match, and were out and binge drinking on the night before the match; they did not return until after dawn, when they were caught severely inebriated by Bradman at breakfast time. Miller was rested for the match, but Lindwall was selected for the match. The home team won the toss and elected to bat, so Lindwall could not rest and sober up in the dressing room while the specialist batsmen were at work. He was asked to bowl a lengthy spell in warm and sunny conditions on the opening morning, and was at times lying on the ground in an attempt to recover during stoppages. Nevertheless, he ended with 1/28 from 16 overs, the opposition still unable to score heavily despite his obvious lethargy. He took a total of 3/59 from 25 overs and scored one as the tourists won by an innings, removing the home team's captain George Mann twice and Edrich once. In the second innings, Lindwall took 2/31, but effectively had a third wicket. He bowled a bouncer at opener Jack Robertson, who tried to hook, but missed, suffered a fractured jaw and was forced to retire hurt, prompting angry shouting and booing from sections of the crowd. Robertson defended Lindwall, contending that the delivery was fair and that he had executed his shot incorrectly.

Fourth Test 

Hutton returned for the Fourth Test at Headingley and played effectively. At one stage he and Washbrook took five boundaries from six Lindwall overs. An opening partnership of 168 resulted until Lindwall bowled him for 81. The English opener went onto the front foot and was clean bowled, much to the dismay of the home crowd. The stand came after Washbrook had decided to refrain from hooking Lindwall's bouncers, which had caused him problems in the earlier Tests. England did not lose their second wicket until the last over of the day, when Washbrook hit Johnston into Lindwall's hands for 143, leaving the total at 2/268. Both Fingleton and O'Reilly criticised the bowling group as a whole for what they deemed a very lethargic display; the former deemed it the worst day's performance since World War II and the latter accused all the Australian bowlers of operating "without object".

During the innings, Lindwall appealed for lbw four times while wicket-keeper Ron Saggers—standing in for the injured Tallon—remained silent, not supporting the appeal. England ran up a large score of 496 but squandered a very strong position after losing their last 8 wickets for 73 runs; Lindwall had Compton caught down the leg side to give Saggers his first Test catch, leaving England at 6/473. Lindwall ended with 2/79 from 38 overs. Fingleton said "this grand fast bowler held the side together splendidly and answered every call". O’Reilly said that until England collapsed—mostly due to unforced errors despite favourable conditions—only Lindwall appeared capable of threatening the batsmen. He said the paceman "kept slogging away, tirelessly retaining his pace and enthusiasm long after the other members of the attack had lost all signs of hostility ... Bradman could not afford to spare him from doing much more than his share of the galley-slave work." O’Reilly decried Lindwall's workload as excessive and potentially harmful to his longevity.

In reply, Australia was still some way behind when Lindwall came in at 6/329 on the third afternoon. With the fall of Sam Loxton and Saggers in quick succession, Bradman's men were at 8/355 with only Johnston and Toshack remaining. Lindwall hit out, scoring 77 in an innings marked by powerful driving and pulling; he dominated in stands of 48 and 55 with Johnston and Toshack respectively. He particularly liked to use his feet to get to the ball on the half-volley to hit lofted drives. Of the 103 runs added for the last two wickets, the two tail-enders managed only 25 between them. Johnston accompanied Lindwall for 80 minutes, before the injured Toshack survived the last 50 minutes until stumps with Johnston running for him. Australia were 9/457 at stumps, with Lindwall on 76 and Toshack on 12. During Lindwall's partnership with Johnston, Yardley bowled himself for over an hour, failing to bring on a frontline bowler in his stead despite being unable to dislodge the batsmen. Lindwall farmed the strike by trying to hit boundaries and twos during the over, but Yardley did not resort to the tactic of setting a deep field to yield a single to Lindwall to get the tailenders on strike. Despite Toshack and Johnston's lack of familiarity with having and acting as a runner respectively, and the resulting disorders in running between the wickets, Lindwall was able to manipulate the strike and face most of the balls. O’Reilly speculated that Yardley may have bowled himself in an attempt to contain the Australians rather than dismiss them before the close of play, so his openers would not have to bat for a short period before stumps when the visitors' attack could have made inroads. However, Yardley was neither able to contain Lindwall nor dismiss the Australians. Sunday was a rest day, and on Monday, the fourth morning, Lindwall was the last man out in the third over of the day, leaving Australia on 458, 38 runs in arrears on the first innings. Lindwall edged Bedser into the slips cordon and Crapp took the catch low down in his left hand.

England made a strong start in their second innings—the openers registered their second century stand for the match. When Australia took the second new ball, Lindwall—worried by the substantial and hazardous craters in the pitch he and the other bowlers had created while following through on the left-hand side of the crease—changed to bowling from around the wicket and was warned for running on the pitch. He reverted to bowling from over the wicket, although he delivered from the edge of the crease to avoid the holes. O’Reilly said the warning to Lindwall played into Australia's hands as the bowler's follow through from around the wicket was accentuating a rough patch outside the right-hander's off stump that the English bowlers target when Bradman's men had to chase the target. England reached 2/232 before Lindwall trapped Edrich to end a 103-run partnership. The paceman followed this by bowling Jack Crapp, who inside edged an attempted forcing stroke through the off side from the back foot onto his own stumps. This triggered a collapse of 4/33 from 3/260 to 7/293. Lindwall took 2/84 as the hosts declared on the final day at 8/365, leaving Australia to chase a world Test record of 404 for victory, with only 345 minutes available. Centuries to Bradman and Morris in a 301-run stand saw Australia seal the series 3–0 with a record-breaking seven-wicket win with 15 minutes in hand.

The paceman was rested for the match against Derbyshire immediately after the Headingley Test, which Australia won by an innings. Lindwall returned for the match against Glamorgan and took 2/36 in a rain-affected draw that did not reach the second innings. In the next match against Warwickshire, he claimed 3/27 in the first innings, taking three consecutive middle-order wickets—including Test batsmen Tom Dollery and Abdul Hafeez Kardar—in the space of 12 balls as the hosts fell for 138. In reply, Australia stumbled to 6/161 when Lindwall joined Hassett. The pair put on 70 for the seventh wicket, the largest partnership in a low-scoring match. Lindwall ended with 45, the second highest score for the entire match, as Australia took a 116-run lead. He took the first wicket and ended with 1/32 as Bradman's men won by nine wickets. Australia proceeded to face Lancashire at Old Trafford for the second time during the season in a match that doubled as Washbrook's benefit. Lindwall made 17 in the tourists' first innings of 321 and then dismissed the home side's first three batsmen, taking 3/32 as Lancashire fell for 130. Washbrook top-scored with 38 before Lindwall had him caught in the slips by Miller. He also collected several painful bruises from Lindwall on his right hand and thumb. Bradman described his leading paceman as being in "stupendous form ... I have not seen before or since such sustained brilliance from a pace bowler". Australia made 3/265 declared in their second innings, leaving the hosts with a target of 457 in less than a day, with Washbrook unable to bat due to Lindwall's bruising bowling. Lindwall bowled both openers with the new ball, but Lancashire appeared to be safely batting out a draw at 5/191 with only eight minutes remaining. Lindwall returned after Bradman took the new ball, and told the slip cordon to move halfway back to the boundary. Bowling with a tailwind, Lindwall was at full pace, in one of the fastest displays Bradman had seen in his long career. He bowled Jack Ikin for 99 and Dick Pollard—who later claimed to have not seen the ball—for a golden duck. The hosts were in danger of suffering a late collapse and defeat, but William Roberts successfully defended the hat-trick ball; Lancashire lost no further wickets and were 7/191 when stumps were drawn; Lindwall ended with 4/27. He also caused Washbrook to miss the final Test with a thumb injury. The paceman was rested from the non-first-class match against Durham, which was a rain-affected draw.

Fifth Test 

According to Bradman, Fingleton and O'Reilly, Lindwall's performance in the final Test at The Oval was one of the best they had ever seen from any player. English skipper Yardley won the toss and elected to bat on a rain-affected pitch, surprising most observers. The damp conditions necessitated the addition of large amounts of sawdust to allow the players to keep their grip. Along with the rain, humidity assisted the bowlers, particularly Lindwall, who managed to make the ball bounce at variable heights.

After Miller had taken an early wicket, Lindwall bounced Compton, resulting in an edge towards the slips cordon. However, the ball continued to rise and cleared the ring of Australian fielders. Hutton called Compton through for a run, but his surprised partner was watching the ball and dropped his bat in panic. Luckily for Compton, the ball went to Hassett at third man, who stopped the ball and waited for the batsman to regather his bat and his composure before returning the ball, thereby forfeiting the opportunity to effect a run out. However, this gesture of sportsmanship cost Australia little, because when Compton was on three, Lindwall bowled another bouncer. Compton attempted a hook shot and Arthur Morris ran from his position at short square leg to take a difficult catch, leaving the hosts at 3/17. Fingleton described Morris's feat as "one of the catches of the season".

After the lunch break, England struggled to 4/35, before Lindwall bowled Yardley with a swinging yorker. The debutant Allan Watkins then batted for 16 balls in an attempt to get off the mark with a series of failed hook shots. He missed an attempted hook shot and was hit in the shoulder by another Lindwall bouncer. Soon after, Watkins was dismissed without scoring after playing across the line and being trapped lbw by Johnston, leaving England at 6/42. Watkins also collected a bruise on his right shoulder for his troubles with Lindwall; this inhibited his bowling later in the match. Following the departure of Watkins, Lindwall removed Godfrey Evans, Alec Bedser and Young, all yorked in the space of two runs. England fell from 6/45 to 9/47, bringing Hollies in at No. 11 to accompany Hutton, who had batted through the innings. Hutton then hit the only boundary of the innings, lofting a straight drive back over Lindwall's head. The ball almost went for six, landing just short of the fence. The home team's innings ended on 52 when Hutton—who never appeared to be troubled by the bowling—leg glanced Lindwall and was caught by wicket-keeper Don Tallon one-handed, at full stretch to his left. Lindwall described the catch as one of the best he had ever seen. In his post-lunch spell, Lindwall bowled a spell of 8.1 overs during which he took 5/8; he totalled 6/20 in 16.1 overs. Bradman described the spell as "the most devastating and one of the fastest I ever saw in Test cricket". Fingleton, who played against the Bodyline attack in 1932–33, said "I was watching a man almost the equal of Larwood [the Bodyline spearhead] in pace ... Truly a great bowler". O'Reilly said that Lindwall's "magnificent performance must go down as one of the greatest bowling efforts in Anglo-Australian Tests. He had two gruelingly long sessions in the innings and overcame each so well that he set the seal on his well-earned reputation as one of the best bowlers ever."

In Australia's reply, Lindwall came in at 6/304 and attacked immediately, scoring two fours before falling for nine. He played a cover drive from the bowling of Young, but hit the ball too early and thus launched it into the air, and it was caught by Edrich at cover point to leave the score at 7/332. The visitors ended on 389 and England started their second innings late on the second day. Debutant John Dewes took strike and got off the mark when he aimed a hook shot and was credited with a boundary when the ball came off his shoulder. Lindwall's steepling bouncer had risen over his bat and narrowly missed his head. Lindwall made the early breakthrough soon after, bowling Dewes—who offered no shot—for 10 to leave England at 1/20. Dewes often committed to playing the ball from the front foot before the bowler delivered the ball, thereby putting himself into difficulty.

Early on the third day, Lindwall bowled Edrich—who was playing across the line—for 28, hitting the off stump with a ball that cut inwards to leave England's score at 64, before Compton and Hutton consolidated the innings and took the total to 2/121 at lunch. Soon after, with his score on 39, Compton aimed a hard cut shot that flew into Lindwall's left hand at second slip for a "freak slip catch" from Johnston's bowling; leaving England at 3/125. Lindwall returned for another spell after lunch and bowled Evans for eight. Evans appeared to not detect Lindwall's yorker in the fading light, and the umpires called off play due to poor visibility after an appeal by Yardley. The next morning, England were bowled out for 188, giving Australia an innings victory and the series 4–0. Lindwall took 3/50 to total 9/70 for the match. He ended the Tests as the leading wicket-taker with 27 wickets at 19.62, and scored 191 runs at 31.83.

Later tour matches 

Seven matches remained on Bradman's quest to go through a tour of England without defeat. Australia batted first against Kent and Lindwall made only one in a total of 361. The paceman took two wickets with the new ball to help reduce the hosts to 5/16, before they were all out for 51; Lindwall ended with 2/16. Forced to follow on, Kent were reduced to 4/37 by three early Lindwall wickets; the victims included Tony Pawson and former Test wicket-keeper Les Ames. The hosts were further hampered by the absence of opener Leslie Todd, who had been hit on the foot by a Lindwall swinging yorker in the first innings. The blow caused so much bruising that Todd's foot could not fit inside his cricket boots. Lindwall ended with 4/25 as Kent fell for 124 to lose by an innings. In his match total of 6/41 from 15 overs, Lindwall bowled four of his victims. The Kent fixture was followed by a match against the Gentlemen of England. Lindwall was not required to bat, and after taking 1/39 in the first innings, Bradman allowed him to rest as Australia enforced the follow on and completed an innings victory. Bradman rested Lindwall for the match against Somerset, which resulted in another innings victory for the tourists. The paceman returned against the South of England—a representative team—scoring an unbeaten 17 in an unbroken 61-run stand with Sam Loxton before Australia declared at 7/522. He then took 1/45 as rain ended the match at the conclusion of the hosts' second innings.

Australia's biggest challenge in the post-Test tour matches was against the Leveson Gower's XI. During the last Australian tour in 1938, this team was effectively a full-strength England outfit, but this time Bradman insisted that only six current Test players be allowed to represent the hosts. After the hosts had complied, the Australian skipper fielded a full-strength team. In a rain-interrupted match, Lindwall bowled Hutton for a duck with the new ball. He returned and took five of the last six wickets to fall as the hosts lost their last six wickets for 57 runs. His last five victims were former England captain Walter Robins and Test players Freddie Brown, Evans, Bedser and Laker. Lindwall ended with 6/59; four of his wickets were bowled, while the other two were caught by Ian Johnson in the slips. He made five as Australia with 8/489 declared; time ran out in the rain-affected match with Leveson-Gower's XI at 0/75.

The tour ended with two non-first-class matches against Scotland. Lindwall was rested from the first, which Australia won by an innings. In the second fixture, Lindwall signed off in a low key manner, scoring 15 and taking a total of 0/28 from 14 overs as Australia ended their campaign with another innings triumph.

Role 

When fit, Lindwall opened the bowling with Miller in the Tests, and the pair operated in short and fiery bursts with the new ball. English cricket administrators had agreed to make a new ball available every 55 overs in the Tests; at the time, the norm was to allow a new ball for every 200 runs scored, something which usually took longer than 55 overs. The new regulation played directly into the hands of the Australians, as a new ball is ideal for fast bowling and the tourists had a vastly superior pace attack. Bradman thus wanted to preserve his two first-choice pacemen for a vigorous attack on the English batsmen every 55 overs. As a result, Lindwall bowled 224 overs, while Australia's third fast bowler Bill Johnston bowled 306. Lindwall led the Test bowling averages, with 27 wickets at 19.62, making him the equal leading wicket-taker along with Johnston, who averaged 23.33. The duo's haul of 27 Test wickets equalled the record for an Australian fast bowler during a tour of England. The Australian pair were substantially ahead the next most successful bowler, England's Alec Bedser, who took 18 wickets at 38.22. Lindwall's role as the leading strike bowler is borne out in his economy and strike rate in both the Tests and all first-class matches. He was the least economical of the three pacemen, but took his wickets more frequently than any other frontline bowler.

In all first-class matches, he took 86 wickets at 15.68 and held onto 14 catches, fielding in the slips. There were many consecutive matches during the tour with no rest day in between, so Bradman ensured Miller and Lindwall remained fresh for the new ball bursts in the Tests by giving them a lighter workload during the tour matches. During all first-class matches, Johnston bowled 851.1 overs, Johnson 668, Lindwall 573.4, Toshack 502, while Miller bowled only 429.4 overs. Outside the Tests, Lindwall bowled 349.3 overs, only the fifth heaviest workload among the Australians in those matches.

The local batsmen were unable to cope with Lindwalls high pace and swing; 43 of his wickets came after his opponent had missed the ball and been bowled. Lindwall scored 411 runs at 24.17 with two fifties in the first-class matches, including 191 at 31.83 in the Tests. Lindwall had limited batting opportunities, usually playing from No. 7 to No. 9. It was hard for Lindwall to get any higher up the order as Australia's other frontline bowlers, such as Colin McCool, Ian Johnson and Doug Ring, all scored centuries and more than 20 fifties each during their first-class career, and were of similar batting ability. As Australia often won by an innings, and declared in the first innings on many occasions due to their batting strength, Lindwall only had 20 innings in his 22 matches, and usually batted at numbers 7, 8 or 9.N- However, he was often effective when he did get an opportunity.

Wisden recognised Lindwall by naming him as one of its five Cricketers of the Year in 1949. The publication cited the paceman's ability to seize the initiative for Australia in all but one of the Tests by taking early wickets. The fast bowler's success was attributed to a "superb control of length and direction, his change of pace and general skill, the like of which in a slower bowler could be classed as cunning". The ferocity of Lindwall's bouncer often prompted opponents to retreat onto the back foot before he had even released the ball. Wisden said that "by whatever standard he is judged ... [Lindwall] must be placed permanently in the gallery of great fast bowlers".

Notes

Statistical note 

n-[1]

This statement can be verified by consulting all of the scorecards for the matches, as listed here.

General notes

References 

 

The Invincibles (cricket)